Sebastián Lartaún (died 9 October 1583) was a Roman Catholic prelate who served as Bishop of Cuzco (1570–1583).

Biography
On 4 September 1570, Sebastián Lartaún was appointed Bishop of Cusco during the papacy of Pope Pius V. On 12 August 1571, he was consecrated bishop by Diego Ramírez Sedeño de Fuenleal, Bishop of Pamplona, with Alfonso Merchante de Valeria, Titular Bishop of Sidon, and Gonzalo Herrera Olivares, Titular Bishop of Laodicea in Phrygia, serving as co-consecratos. He served as Bishop of Cuzco until his death on 9 October 1583.

While bishop, he was the principal co-consecrator of Alfonso Guerra, Bishop of Paraguay (1582).

References

External links and additional sources
 (for Chronology of Bishops) 
 (for Chronology of Bishops) 

Year of birth unknown
1583 deaths
16th-century Roman Catholic bishops in Peru
Bishops appointed by Pope Pius V
Roman Catholic bishops of Cusco